Tanganyika was a sovereign state, comprising the mainland part of present-day Tanzania, that existed from 1961 until 1964. It first gained independence from the United Kingdom on 9 December 1961 as a state headed by Queen Elizabeth II before becoming a republic within the Commonwealth of Nations a year later. After signing the Articles of Union on 22 April 1964 and passing an Act of Union on 25 April, Tanganyika officially joined with the People's Republic of Zanzibar to form the United Republic of Tanganyika and Zanzibar on Union Day, 26 April 1964. The new state changed its name to the United Republic of Tanzania within a year.

History

Tanganyika originally consisted of the Tanganyika Territory, the British share of German East Africa, which the British took under a League of Nations Mandate in 1922, and which was later transformed into a United Nations Trust Territory after World War II. The next largest share of German East Africa was taken into Belgian trusteeship, eventually becoming present-day Rwanda and Burundi.

The Tanganyika Independence Act 1961 transformed the United Nations trust territory into the independent sovereign state of Tanganyika, with Elizabeth II as queen of Tanganyika. The monarch's constitutional roles were mostly exercised by the governor-general of Tanganyika.

Tanganyika adopted a new constitution in 1962 that abolished the monarchy, with the National Assembly (the majority of whom were members of the Tanganyika African National Union Party) drastically revising the new constitution to favor a strong executive branch of government, namely a president. Tanganyika then became a republic within the Commonwealth of Nations, with Julius Nyerere as president of Tanganyika. After the Union of Zanzibar and Tanganyika, an interim constitution amended from the 1962 Constitution became the governing document. Although meant to be temporary, the constitutions remained effective until 1977.

The unification of Tanganyika and Zanzibar in 1964 followed Nyerere's principle of Ujamaa which entailed a strong "territorial nationalism."

See also
 Postage stamps and postal history of Tanganyika
 Tanganyika laughter epidemic

References

 
Former republics
Tanganyika
Government of Tanzania
Politics of Tanzania
States and territories established in 1961
States and territories disestablished in 1964
Tanzania and the Commonwealth of Nations
Monarchy
1961 establishments in Africa
1964 disestablishments in Africa
Former member states of the United Nations